Otacílio Gonçalves da Silva Junior (born 16 June 1940 in Santa Maria) is a former Brazilian football manager who was active as the manager of Paraná Clube. He started his managerial career in Internacional, and later managed many Brazilian clubs, the Kuwait national team and Japan.

Otacílio Gonçalves has won the Campeonato Gaúcho twice, with Internacional in 1984 and Grêmio in 1988, and the Campeonato Paranaense four times, with Atlético Paranaense in 1985, with Pinheiros in 1987, and with Paraná in 1991 and 1995.

Managerial statistics

Honours 
Internacional
 Campeonato Gaúcho: 1984

 Atlético Paranaense
 Campeonato Paranaense: 1985

Grêmio
 Campeonato Gaúcho: 1988

Paraná
 Campeonato Paranaense: 1991, 1995
 Campeonato Brasileiro Série B: 1992

References

External links

1940 births
Living people
People from Santa Maria, Rio Grande do Sul
Brazilian football managers
Expatriate football managers in Paraguay
Expatriate football managers in Japan
Campeonato Brasileiro Série A managers
Campeonato Brasileiro Série B managers
Paraguayan Primera División managers
J1 League managers
Sport Club Internacional managers
Club Athletico Paranaense managers
Coritiba Foot Ball Club managers
Grêmio Foot-Ball Porto Alegrense managers
Cerro Porteño managers
Associação Portuguesa de Desportos managers
Paraná Clube managers
Sociedade Esportiva Palmeiras managers
Clube Atlético Mineiro managers
Yokohama Flügels managers
Sociedade Esportiva do Gama managers
Santa Cruz Futebol Clube managers
Brazilian expatriate sportspeople in Kuwait
Kuwait national football team managers
Expatriate football managers in Kuwait
Brazilian expatriate football managers
Brazilian expatriate sportspeople in Japan
Brazilian expatriate sportspeople in Paraguay
Sportspeople from Rio Grande do Sul